The March 89C , and its deriatives, the 89P and 89CE, are open-wheel race car chassis, designed and built by March Engineering, to compete in the 1989 IndyCar season. The 89C chassis only won one  race, and took two pole positions, all with Teo Fabi. It was powered by numerous engines, including the Cosworth DFX turbo engine, the Porsche Indy V8 engine, and the Alfa Romeo Indy V8 engine.

References

Racing cars
March vehicles
American Championship racing cars